Miguel Velázquez Torres (born 27 December 1944) is a former Spanish boxer at Light Welterweight. He competed in the men's light welterweight event at the 1964 Summer Olympics.

Olympic games results 
1964 (as a Light welterweight)
Lost to Hoji Yonekura (Japan) 2-3

Professional career 
Velázquez turned pro in 1966 and captured the WBC light welterweight title in 1976 with a disqualification win over Saensak Muangsurin in his 72nd pro fight. He lost the title later that year in his first defense in a rematch to Muangsurin, via 2nd-round TKO. Velasquez retired after the loss, but had a brief comeback in 1979.

References

External links 
 

1944 births
Living people
World boxing champions
Spanish male boxers
Olympic boxers of Spain
Boxers at the 1964 Summer Olympics
Place of birth missing (living people)
Light-welterweight boxers